Kordel is a municipality in the Trier-Saarburg district, in Rheinland-Pfalz, Germany.

It is home to the ruins of Ramstein Castle.

Kordel was severely affected by the 2021 European floods.

References

Trier-Saarburg